{{DISPLAYTITLE:Muscarinic acetylcholine receptor M1}}

The muscarinic acetylcholine receptor M1, also known as the cholinergic receptor, muscarinic 1, is a muscarinic receptor that in humans is encoded by the CHRM1 gene. It is localized to 11q13.

This receptor is found mediating slow EPSP at the ganglion in the postganglionic nerve, is common in exocrine glands and in the CNS.

It is predominantly found bound to G proteins of class Gq that use upregulation of phospholipase C and, therefore, inositol trisphosphate and intracellular calcium as a signalling pathway. A receptor so bound would not be susceptible to CTX or PTX. However, Gi (causing a downstream decrease in cAMP) and Gs (causing an increase in cAMP) have also been shown to be involved in interactions in certain tissues, and so would be susceptible to PTX and CTX respectively.

Effects
EPSP in autonomic ganglia
 Secretion from salivary glands
 Gastric acid secretion from stomach
 In CNS (memory?)
 Vagally-induced bronchoconstriction
 Mediating olfactory behaviors (e.g. aggression, mating)
Antagonism - delirium hallucinations (the M1 receptor is the only known muscarinic receptor to have this effect as of 2015)

Occurrence in free living amoebae 
A structural but not sequential homolog of the human M1 receptor has been reported in Acanthamoeba castellanii and Naegleria fowleri. Antagonists of human M1 receptors (e.g. atropine, diphenhydramine) have been shown to exert anti-proliferative effects on these pathogens.

Mechanism 

It couples to Gq, and, to a small extent, Gi and Gs. This results in slow EPSP and decreased K+ conductance. It is preassembled to the Gq heterotrimer through a polybasic c-terminal domain.

Ligands

Agonists

 acetylcholine
 carbachol
 cevimeline 
 muscarine
 oxotremorine
 pilocarpine 
 vedaclidine
 xanomeline
 77-LH-28-1 - brain penetrant selective M1 allosteric agonist
 CDD-0097
 McN-A-343 - mixed M1/M4 agonist
 L-689, L-660 - mixed M1/M3 agonist

Allosteric modulators
benzylquinolone carboxylic acid
BQZ-12
VU-0090157
VU-0029767
VU0467319
[3H]PT-1284- M1-selective PAM Radioligand

Antagonists

atropine
diphenhydramine
tramadol
dicycloverine
fluoxetine
hyoscyamine
ipratropium
mamba toxin muscarinic toxin 7 (MT7)
Many antipsychotics like olanzapine, quetiapine, clozapine, chlorpromazine
pirenzepine
oxybutynin
Benzatropine
telenzepine
paroxetine
Tricyclic and tetracyclic antidepressants like clomipramine, imipramine, mirtazapine, amitriptyline
tolterodine
Biperiden

See also 
 Muscarinic acetylcholine receptor

References

Further reading

External links 
 

Muscarinic acetylcholine receptors